Myxodagnus macrognathus is a species of sand stargazer that is known to occur off the Pacific coasts of Mexico and Peru.  It can reach a maximum length of  SL.

References

macrognathus
Fish described in 1946